This is a list of students of music, organized by teacher.

A

Arkady Abaza

Christian Ferdinand Abel

Hermann Abendroth

Hans Abrahamsen

Dieter Acker

Adolphe Adam

Louis Adam

John Luther Adams

Murray Adaskin

Guido Adler

Oskar Adler

Samuel Adler

Jakob Adlung

Albrecht Agthe

Webster Aitken

Jean-Delphin Alard

Jules Alary

Johann Friedrich Alberti

Johann Georg Albrechtsberger

Vincenzo Albrici

Putnam Aldrich

Amanda Christina Elizabeth Aldridge

Arthur Alexander

Charles-Valentin Alkan

Joe Allard

Pedro Humberto Allende

Julius Alsleben

Johann Christoph Altnickol

Javier Álvarez

William Alwyn

August Ferdinand Anacker

Jorge Anckermann

Johann Anton André

Volkmar Andreae

Mihail Andricu

Hendrik Andriessen

Louis Andriessen

<ref>George Henry Hubert Lascelles Earl of Harewood. Opera, Volume 52, Issues 7–12, p.1502].</ref>

Pasquale Anfossi

Domenico Annibali

Conrad Ansorge

George Antheil

Alfredo Antonini

no pupils

Giuseppe Aprile

Jones (2014), p.334.

Violet Archer

Bülent Arel

Anton Arensky

"Russian CD Notes ", ArizonaChamberMusic.org.

"Paul Juon The Russian Brahms", WRTI.org.

Wyndham & L'Epine (1915), p.225.
Bowers, Faubion (1996). Scriabin, a Biography, p.152. Courier Dover. .

Dominick Argento

Carl Armbrust

Thomas Armstrong

Michael Arne

Richard Arnell

 
 
Christopher Wright 

Simha Arom

Claudio Arrau

Désirée Artôt

 Vicente Asencio 

Robert Ashley

Sadie & Samuel (1994), p.13.

Thomas Attwood

Daniel Auber

Louis Aubert

Tony Aubin

  

Leopold Auer

 Moritz Frenkel

Mason (1917), p.304.

Larry Austin

Jones (2014), p.21.

Charles Avison

Edmund Ayrton

B

Kees van Baaren

Milton Babbitt

Theorists
Griffiths (2011), p.232.

Composers

Gagné (2012), p.25.

Randel (1996), p.382.

 (jazz guitarist and composer)

Jones (2014), p.400.
Randel (1996), p.568.

Other
 (theatre composer)

August Wilhelm Bach

Carl Philipp Emanuel Bach

Johann Christian Bach

Johann Sebastian Bach
J.S. Bach (1685–1750) studied with teachers including , his brother Johann Christoph Bach, and Dieterich Buxtehude

van Boer (2012), p.25.

van Boer (2012), p.163.
Randel (1996), p.301.

van Boer (2012), p.309.
Randel (1996), p.466.

 (1708–1780)

 (1715)

Wilhelm Friedemann Bach

Oskar Back

Agathe Backer-Grøndahl

Madame 

Ernst Bacon

Randel (1996), p.274.

Carl Baermann

Pierre Baillot

Mason (1917), p.18.

Simon Bainbridge

Giuseppe Baini

Edward Bairstow

Claude Baker

Julius Baker

Mily Balakirev

Sergey Balasanian

Claude Balbastre

Artur Balsam

Nikhil Banerjee

Granville Bantock

Charles Barbandt

Samuel Barber

Stanisław Barcewicz

Woldemar Bargiel

Clarence Barlow

Joseph Barnby

Georges Barrère

Karl Heinrich Barth

 

Béla Bartók

McGraw (2001), p.8.

Jones (2014), p.58.

Marmaduke Barton

Leslie Bassett

  

 *

Harold Bauer

John Elvin

Marion Bauer

Randel (1996), p.53.

Julián Bautista

François Bazin

Antonio Bazzini

Robert Beadell

Franz Ignaz Beck

Reginald Bedford

Bob Hahn
Gordon Hancock
 

Jack Beeson

Ludwig van Beethoven

Hinson (1993), p.74.Greene (1985), p.445.

Randel (1996), p.772.

David Behrman

Felix Benda

Franz Benda

Agostino Bendinelli

Julius Benedict

Orazio Benevoli

Paul Ben-Haim

Arthur Benjamin

Frank Bennett

William Sterndale Bennett

Antonín Bennewitz

François Benoist

Peter Benoit

Warren Benson

Emerik Beran

Charles Auguste de Bériot

Mason (1917), p.251.

Yara Bernette

Alban Berg

Hinson (1993), p.7.
Gillespie (2013), p.422.

Whittall, Arnold. 2008. The Cambridge Introduction to Serialism, p.68. Cambridge Introductions to Music. New York: Cambridge University Press.  (hardback)  (pbk).

Arthur Berger

Gagné (2012), p.161.

Ludwig Berger

Erik Bergman

William Bergsma

 

"Peter Schickele Bio", Schickele.com.

Oscar Beringer

 

Lennox Berkeley

Gagné (2012), p.169.

Luciano Berio

McGraw (2001), p.6.

Charles-Wilfrid de Bériot

Hector Berlioz

Ercole Bernabei

Antonio Bernacchi

Nicolas Bernier

Leonard Bernstein

Martin Berteau

Henri-Montan Berton

Ferdinando Bertoni

Franz Berwald

William Berwald

William Thomas Best

Carlo Besozzi

Philip Bezanson

Franz Bieling

E. Power Biggs

 Marie Bigot 

William Billings

Harrison Birtwistle

Henry Bishop

Giancarlo Bizzi

Boris Blacher

Easley Blackwood

Michel Blavet

Ernest Bloch

Gagné (2012), p.19.

Joseph Bloch

Karl-Birger Blomdahl

Robert Bloom

John Blow

 Felix Blumenfeld 

Nicolas-Charles Bochsa

Mason (1917), p.67.

Carl Maria von Bocklet

Peer Bode

Theobald Boehm

Semyon Bogatyrev

Georg Böhm

 (Erfurt)
 (possibly)

Joseph Böhm

François-Adrien Boieldieu

Théodore Labarre

Giuseppe Bonno

Giovanni Maria Bononcini

Josiah Booth

Tomás Borba

Marco Bordogni

Benjamin Boretz

Giovanni Borghi

Felix Borowski

Hélène Boschi

Marco Enrico Bossi

Nadia Boulanger

Neither Boulanger nor Annette Dieudonné, her lifelong friend and assistant, kept a record of every student who studied with Boulanger. In addition, it is virtually impossible to determine the exact nature of an individual's private study with Boulanger. All in all, Boulanger is believed to have taught a very large number of students from Europe, Australia, Mexico, Argentina and Canada, as well as over 600 American musicians.

A

B

C

D

E

F

Randel (1996), p.268.

G

Jones (2014), p.252.

H

Gagné (2012), p.125.

I

J

K

L

M

N

O

P

Gann (1997), p.106.

R

S

T

V
Jane Vignery
W

X

Y

Z

Pierre Boulez

Joseph Flummerfelt, Donald Nally (2010). Conversations with Joseph Flummerfelt: Thoughts on Conducting, Music, and Musicians, p.107n8. Rowman & Littlefield. .

Randel, ed. (1996), p.246.

Adrian Boult

Nicholas Cleobury

Victor Hely-Hutchinson
Stanford Robinson
Stanley Herbert Wilson
Barry Wordsworth

York Bowen

Armen Boyajian

William Boyce

Martin Boykan

Johannes Brahms

Hans Brandts-Buys

Henry Brant

Marianne Brandt

Louis Brassin

Martin Bresnick

Gagné (2012), p.117.

Gagné (2012), p.156.

Herbert Brewer

Frank Bridge

Frederick Bridge

Richard Brind

José Brocá

Charles Broche

Jascha Brodsky

Moritz Brosig

Harriet Brower

Earle Brown

Max Bruch

 

Anton Bruckner

Greene (1985), p.893.

Fritz Brun

Herbert Brün

Hans Buchner

Dudley Buck

Harold Budd

Hans von Bülow

 Friedrich Burgmüller 

Adolf Busch

  

Alan Bush

  

  

Ferruccio Busoni

 (the noted dancer)

Henri Büsser

Ludwig Bussler

Dieterich Buxtehude

William Byrd

Mason (1917), p.34.

See also
 List of former students of the Conservatoire de Paris

References
Citations

Sources

 
 
 Gann, Kyle (1997). American Music in the Twentieth Century. Schirmer. .
 Green, Janet M. & Thrall, Josephine (1908). [https://books.google.com/books?id=21Q5AAAAIAAJ&q=%22studied+with%22&pg=PA91 The American history and encyclopedia of music. I. Squire.
 Greene, David Mason (1985). Greene's Biographical Encyclopedia of Composers. Reproducing Piano Roll Fnd.. .
 Griffiths, Paul (2011). Modern Music and After. Oxford University Press. .
 Highfill, Philip H. (1991). A Biographical Dictionary of Actors, Actresses, Musicians, Dancers, Managers, and Other Stage Personnel in London, 1660 – 1800: S. Siddons to Thrnne. SIU Press. .
 Hinkle-Turner, Elizabeth (2006). Women Composers and Music Technology in the United States: Crossing the Line. Ashgate Publishing. .
 Hinson, Maurice (2001). Music for More than One Piano: An Annotated Guide. Indiana University Press. .
 Jones, Barrie; ed. (2014). The Hutchinson Concise Dictionary of Music. Routledge. .
 Mason, Daniel Gregory (1917). The Art of Music: A Comprehensive Library of Information for Music Lovers and Musicians. The National Society of Music. . ( Related books via Google).
 McGraw, Cameron (2001). Piano Duet Repertoire: Music Originally Written for One Piano, Four Hands. Indian University. .
 
 
 Sadie, Julie Anne & Samuel, Rhian; eds. (1994). The Norton/Grove Dictionary of Women Composers. W. W. Norton & Company. .
 Saxe Wyndham, Henry & L'Epine, Geoffrey; eds. (1915). Who's who in Music: A Biographical Record of Contemporary Musicians. I. Pitman & Sons.
 Wier, Albert Ernest (1938). The Macmillan encyclopedia of music and musicians. Macmillan.

Students by teacher